The Page Sandstone is a geologic formation in Utah. It preserves fossils dating back to the Jurassic period.

See also

 List of fossiliferous stratigraphic units in Utah
 Paleontology in Utah

References
 

Jurassic geology of Utah